Sudarwati (born 1 November 1937), better known by her stage name Titiek Puspa, is an Indonesian singer and songwriter. Rolling Stone Indonesia has selected two of her songs as some of the best Indonesian songs of all time.

Biography
Puspa was born with the name Sudarwati in Tanjung, South Kalimantan on 1 November 1937 to Tugeno Puspowidjojo and Siti Mariam. Her family later changed her name to Kadarwati and then finally Sumarti. As a child, she wanted to be a kindergarten teacher. However, after winning several singing competitions she decided to become an entertainer, making the decision around age 14. Her parents forbade her from doing so.

After winning the Radio Republik Indonesia singing competition in Semarang, Central Java, Puspa was asked by Sjaiful Bachri of the Jakarta Symphony Orchestra to sing for them. After her performance of Ismail Marzuki's song "Chandra Buana", the group elected to keep her as their regular singer. She left the orchestra in 1962. Her stage name was chosen by President Sukarno during the 1950s.

In 1957 Puspa married Mus Mualim, a Radio Republik Indonesia employee. By 1963 they had two daughters. During this period Puspa began to study songwriting, learning from her husband. Aside from singing and songwriting, Puspa also acts.

In 2009, Puspa was diagnosed with cervical cancer. After several months of treatment, including two months of chemotherapy at the Mount Elizabeth Hospital in Singapore (where she wrote 61 songs), she was declared to be free of cancer. She credits her prayer and meditation in the hospital for her success at fighting cancer.

Songwriting
In a 2008 interview with Bruce Edmond of The Jakarta Post, Puspa stated that "[s]ongs are my medicine, my vitamins, they make my life better."

Legacy

Puspa has been described as "the grand dame of Indonesian entertainment". In 1963 the Indonesian variety magazine Varia described her name and voice as "inseparable", writing that listeners would stop their activities to focus on her songs when played on the radio.

Alberthiene Endah wrote a biography of Puspa, entitled "A Legendary Diva". It was released in 2008.

Two of Puspa's songs, "Kupu-Kupu Malam" ("Nighttime Butterflies", from the album of the same name) and "Bing" (from Cinta) were selected as some of the best Indonesian songs of all time by Rolling Stone Indonesia in 2009. "Kupu-Kupu Malam" was ranked 32nd; the write-up noted that the song was an unbiased look at prostitution in Indonesia, with Puspa's vocals at times as if she were holding back tears and at other times roaring with strength. "Bing", Puspa's tribute to Bing Slamet, was ranked 41st and described as being capable of expressing her feelings of loss without coming across as overly emotional.

Personal life
Puspa is married to director Mus Mualim. Together they have two children. , Puspa lives in South Jakarta.

Works

Discography
The following is a partial list of Puspa's albums.
Kisah Hidup (Life's Story; 1963)
Mama (1964)
Bing (1973)
Kupu-Kupu Malam (Night Butterflies; 1977)
Apanya Dong (What; 1982)
Horas Kasih (Greetings, Dear; 1983)
Virus Cinta (Love Virus; 1997)

Filmography

The following is a partial list of sinetron and films that Puspa has performed in.
Minah Gadis Dusun (Minah the Village Girl; 1965)
Di Balik Cahaya Gemerlapan (Behind the Shimmering Light; 1976)
Inem Pelayan Sexy (Inem the Sexy Maid; 1976)
Karminem (1977)
Rojali dan Juhela (Rojali and Juhela; 1980)
Koboi Sutra Ungu (Purple Silk Cowboy; 1982)

Awards and nominations

References
Footnotes

Bibliography

 Songs discussed on pages 58 and 61.

External links
 

People from South Kalimantan
Living people
1937 births
20th-century Indonesian women singers
Indonesian songwriters
Anugerah Musik Indonesia winners